Yfantis or Ifantis is a Greek occupational surname meaning "weaver". It may refer to:

 Elias Yfantis (b. 1936), Greek footballer
 Yannis Yfantis (b. 1949), Greek poet

Greek-language surnames
Occupational surnames